Ironoquia plattensis, the Platte River caddisfly, is a species of caddisfly in the family Limnephilidae. It is endemic to Nebraska. This species was first described to science in 2000.

This caddisfly was described from its habitat on the Platte River in central Nebraska. Its type locality is near Grand Island. It lives in sloughs, where it proceeds through its life cycle in a relatively small patch of habitat. The larva moves from aquatic to terrestrial locations in the spring, aestivates through the summer, and pupates in autumn. This process occurs when the wetlands become dry during the warmer months, experiencing reduced and intermittent water flows. In September and October the adults take flight and produce eggs.

Initial studies found the species to be abundant at its type locality, but its distribution was thought to be very limited. Further surveys located the species at more sites, and following a 12-month assessment, the United States Fish and Wildlife Service in 2012 determined the Platte River caddisfly was not suited to be listed as an endangered species.  The agency conducted more than 100 surveys and found the insect at 35 sites across a large part of Nebraska, many of which appear to be free from threats.

After the initial decision by the Fish and Wildlife Service, more studies of the biology of the insect found its range to be fragmented, and it only occurs in river habitat that is not disturbed or altered. This suggests it can be used as an indicator species, one that occurs in pristine local wetland habitat and disappears once that habitat becomes degraded and loses its defining qualities. The insect is not found in parts of its range where the Platte River has been channelized and diverted to canals to provide irrigation, for example. This diversion eliminates warm-water sloughs from the sides of the river, changing the local ecology in such a way that the insect cannot persist. Other changes to the Platte River in this area include regulation of water flow, conversion of riparian meadows to agricultural fields, and depletion of the aquifer associated with the river. Initial studies of agricultural land along the river suggest that high-intensity livestock grazing may degrade wetland vegetation and grazing sites should be rotated to allow more natural cycles.

In ecological surveys of the area, other animal species observed include fish such as the plains topminnow (Fundulus sciadicus), brassy minnow (Hybognathus hankinsoni), fathead minnow (Pimephales promelas), and Iowa darter (Etheostoma exile), and amphibians such as the plains leopard frog (Lithobates blairi), western chorus frog (Pseudacris triseriata), and Woodhouse's toad (Anaxyrus woodhousii). The caddisfly and many other aquatic, semiaquatic, and terrestrial insects are food for such fauna; the Platte River caddisfly is a common food source for the brook stickleback (Culaea inconstans).

See also 
 Salt Creek tiger beetle

References

External links 
 

Integripalpia
Fauna of Nebraska
Insects described in 2000